Chhatari is a Town in Bulandshahr district  in the state of Uttar Pradesh, India.

History
Chhatari was a jagir during  British India. It was owned by Nawabs of Lalkhani, a Badgujar Rajput community.

Nawabs of Chhatari
 Nawab Mardan Ali Khan
 Nawab Mehmud Ali Khan
 Nawab Luft Ali Khan
 Nawab Abdul Ali Khan IV
 Nawab Abdul Samad Khan (1862-1922)
 Nawab Abdul Sami Khan
 Nawab Hafiz Sir Ahmad Said Khan I (1888-1981)

Amenities
There are two nationalized bank, one degree college, a sub post office and also have an agro-products trading center for farmers residing near town.

Demographics
 India census, Chhatari had a population of 15786. Males constitute 54% of the population and females 46%.

Notable people
 Muhammad Ahmad Said Khan Chhatari "Nawab of Chhatari", a prominent Muslim League politician, and last Prime Minister of the Hyderabad State. Also the First Chief Minister of Uttar Pradesh After Freedom.

References

Cities and towns in Bulandshahr district
Zamindari estates